Iglesia de San Juan de Dios is a church in the city of Puebla's historic centre, in the Mexican state of Puebla.

External links

 

Historic centre of Puebla
Roman Catholic churches in Puebla (city)